The 1996–97 Cypriot Second Division was the 42nd season of the Cypriot second-level football league. AEL won their 1st title.

Format
Fourteen teams participated in the 1996–97 Cypriot Second Division. All teams played against each other twice, once at their home and once away. The team with the most points at the end of the season crowned champions. The first three teams were promoted to 1997–98 Cypriot First Division and the last three teams were relegated to the 1997–98 Cypriot Third Division.

Changes from previous season
Teams promoted to 1996–97 Cypriot First Division
 APOP Paphos
 APEP
 Anagennisi Deryneia

Teams relegated from 1995–96 Cypriot First Division
 AEL Limassol
 Evagoras Paphos
 Omonia Aradippou

Teams promoted from 1995–96 Cypriot Third Division
 Ermis Aradippou
 Achyronas Liopetriou 
 AEK Kakopetrias

Teams relegated to 1996–97 Cypriot Third Division
 Ethnikos Latsion
 Othellos Athienou
 Ayia Napa

League standings

Results

See also
 Cypriot Second Division
 1996–97 Cypriot First Division
 1996–97 Cypriot Cup

Sources

Cypriot Second Division seasons
Cyprus
1996–97 in Cypriot football